College Branch is a stream in Marion County in the U.S. state of Missouri.

College Branch took its name from a now defunct college in West Ely.

See also
List of rivers of Missouri

References

Rivers of Marion County, Missouri
Rivers of Missouri